The Cavan Senior Hurling Championship is an annual Gaelic Athletic Association competition between the top hurling clubs in Cavan. The winners of the Cavan Championship qualify to represent their county in the Ulster Club Championship, the winners of which go on to the All-Ireland Senior Club Hurling Championship. This championship has never been played on a consistent basis, and has frequently not been completed. In 2010, Mullahoran won the title for the 21st successive year. That run of victories was ended in 2011 when Ballymachugh beat Mullahoran in the final. In 2017, Mullahoran won their first title in four years with a win over Cootehill on a scoreline of 4–19 to 0–05. Cootehill are the current champions, having won the 2022 championship title.

History

20th century
The first recorded Cavan county championship final was played between Cavan Slashers and Belturbet in 1908. Belturbet reportedly won the game by 2–8 to 1–3. The next recorded county competition was in 1922, and GAA records indicate that Cavan Slashers were 1922 champions. The championship was held inconsistently over the coming decades, until "hurling again vanished from the Cavan G.A.A. scene in 1954". Senior county hurling finals were not held again in Cavan, with any consistency, until the 1980s.

21st century
Mullahoran won 21 back-to-back titles in the late 20th and early 21st centuries, until 2011 when that run was ended in a defeat to Ballymachugh in the 2011 final. Cootehill and Mullahoran were the two main clubs in the competition during the second decade of the 21st century, meeting in the final in 2013, 2015, 2016 and 2017.

In the 2014 competition, Mullahoran (the defending champions) were defeated in the group stage. Cootehill won the title for only their third time ever and the first time since 1965 following a 5–7 to 1–6 defeat of Ballymachugh in a replay of the final.

In 2015, Cootehill Celtic successfully defended their title, becoming champions for the 4th time. On 27 September 2015, in a final held at Kingspan Breffni Park, Mullahoran made a comeback to force a draw and a replay. Cootehill won the replayed final, held on 30 September 2015, on a scoreline of 0–7 to 0–4.

Cootehill were "fancied to defend" their title in the 2016 final, which was held on 25 September 2016. In the game, Mullahoran St Joseph's beat Cootehill Celtic by 2–7 to 2–6. However, Cootehill were later awarded the title (their 5th title) as Mullahoran were adjudged to have fielded an ineligible player.

The 2020 championship was held in September 2020, involving four teams representing Cootehill Celtic GAA, Mullahoran GAA, East Cavan Gaels and Pearse Óg GAA club. Mullahoran won the 2020 final, beating Cootehill Celtic by 2–09 to 1–11. Cootehill Celtic won back-to-back titles in 2021 and 2022.

Top winners

Roll of honour

References

Notes

Sources

External links
 Hurling page on Cavan GAA website (archived 2007)
 Cavan on Hoganstand
 GAA club roll of honour (archived)

 
Hurling competitions in County Cavan
Hurling competitions in Ulster
Senior hurling county championships